Blau im Blau (Blue in Blue) is the fifth studio album by German recording artist Yvonne Catterfeld, released by Sony Music on 5 March 2010 in German-speaking Europe.

Track listing

Charts

Weekly charts

Release history

References

External links
 YvonneCatterfeld.com — official site

2010 albums
Yvonne Catterfeld albums